Sialkot District (Punjabi and ), is one of the districts of Punjab province of Pakistan. It is located in the Majha region of Panjab, otherwise the northeast of the province. The city of Sialkot is the capital of the district. The Sialkot Cantonment was established in 1852.

Administration
The district is administratively divided into the following four tehsils (subdivisions), which contain a total of 122 Union Councils:

History
Sialkot District was an agricultural region with forests during the Indus Valley Civilization. The Vedic period is characterized by Indo-Aryan culture that flourished in Punjab region. The Kambojas, Daradas, Kaikayas, Madras, Pauravas, Yaudheyas, Malavas and Kurus invaded, settled and ruled ancient Punjab region. After overrunning the Achaemenid Empire in 331 BCE, Alexander marched into the present-day Punjab region with an army of 50,000. The Sialkot was ruled by Maurya Empire, Indo-Greek kingdom, Kushan Empire, Gupta Empire, White Huns, Kushano-Hephthalites and the Turk and Hindu Shahi kingdoms.

In 997 CE, Sultan Mahmud Ghaznavi, took over the Ghaznavid dynasty empire established by his father, Sultan Sebuktegin, In 1005 he conquered the Shahis in Kabul in 1005, and followed it by the conquests of Punjab region. The Delhi Sultanate and later Mughal Empire ruled the region.

The legendary history of the District is connected with Raja Salivahan, the reputed founder of the town of Sialkot, and his famous son Rasalu. Pasrur is also an ancient place. At an early date the District fell to the Rajas of Jammu, and under the Mughals formed the Rechna Doab sarkar of the Subah of Lahore. Under Shah Jahan the sarkar was entrusted to Ali Mardan Khan, the famous engineer, who dug a canal through it to bring water from the Chenab river to the imperial gardens in Lahore. On the decline of the Mughal Empire Ranjit Singh Deo, a Rajput hill chief, extended his sway over the lowlands, owning a nominal allegiance to Delhi. In 1748 he transferred his allegiance to Ahmad Shah Durrani, who added Zafarwal and two other parganas to his fief. Before his death in 1773 Ranjit Deo had secured possession of the whole District, except the Sialkot town and its dependencies, which were held by a Pashtun family.

During the Indian Rebellion of 1857 the station was denuded of British troops; and the Native regiments which were left behind the rose, and, after sacking the jail, treasury, and courthouse, and massacring several of the European inhabitants, marched off towards Delhi, only to be destroyed by Nicholson at Trimmu Ghat. The rest of the Europeans took refuge in the fort, and on the morning after the departure of the rebels order was restored. The only events of interest in the subsequent history of the District are the plague riots that occurred at the villages of Shahzada and Sankhatra in 1901.

Numerous mounds are scattered about the District, which mark the sites of ancient villages and towns. None of them, except that on which the Sialkot fort stood, has been excavated, but silver and copper utensils and coins have been dug up from time to time by villagers. Most of the coins are those of Indo-Bactrian kings. The excavations in Sialkot revealed the existence of some old baths, with hot-water pipes of solid masonry. The fort itself, of which very little now remains, is not more than 1,000 years old and is said to have been rebuilt by Shahab-ud-din Ghori at the end of the twelfth century.

In 1859, Gurdaspur, Amritsar and Sialkot were placed in the new division of Sialkot. But in 1884, Gurdaspur along with Amritsar again became a part of the Lahore Division.

According to the 1901 census, the district had a population of 1,083,909 and contained 7 towns and 2,348 villages. The population at previous three enumerations were: 1,004,695 (1868), 1,012,148 (1881) and 1,119,847 (1891). The population decreased between 1891 and 1901 by 3.2, the decrease being greatest in the Raya tahsil and least in the Daska tahsil. The Chenab Colony was responsible for this fall in population, no less than 103,000 persons having left to take land in the newly irrigated tracts.

The district was subdivided into five tehsils, namely: Sialkot, Pasrur, Zafarwal, Raya and Daska, the headquarters of each being at the place from which it is named. The chief towns of the district were Sialkot, Daska, Jamki, Pasrur, Kila Sobha Singh, Zafarwal and Narowal.

In 1930, the tehsils of Raya, Daska and Pasrur were split up and parts of these were amalgamated into Gujranwala District. In 1991, the tehsils of Narowal and Shakar Garh (which was tehsil Shankar Garh of Gurdaspur district before the independence of Pakistan in 1947) were split up and formed into the new Narowal District.

Geography
Sialkot District lies southeast of Gujrat District, southwest of Jammu district (in Jammu and Kashmir, India), while Narowal District is to the southeast and Gujranwala District is situated to the west.
Sialkot district is spread over an area of 3,016 square kilometers.
Sialkot is hot and humid during the summer and cold during the winter. June and July are the hottest months. The land is generally plain and fertile. The average annual rainfall is about 1000 mm. Over 25.82% of the population of the district is urban.

Demographics
At the time of the 2017 census, the district had a population of 3,894,938, of which 1,921,289 were males and 1,973,150 females. Rural population is 2,750,403 while the urban population is 1,144,535. Islam is the predominant religion with 96.04% of the population while Christians are 3.50% of the population.

At the time of the 2017 census, 94.92% of the population spoke Punjabi, 2.47% Urdu and 1.26% Pashto as their first language.

There is a small Hindu community in Sialkot. The Shivala Teja Singh temple is a historic Hindu temple in Sialkot.

Notable people

Historical figures
Allama Iqbal, poet and philosopher
Sir Muhammad Zafarullah Khan, Pakistan's first Foreign Minister and President of the UN-General Assembly
Faiz Ahmad Faiz, poet and scholar
Syed Faiz-ul Hassan Shah, great orator, poet and pir, has been president of Jamiat Ulema-e-Pakistan
Zafar Ali Khan writer, poet, and journalist who played an important role in the Pakistan Movement
Sir Fazl-i-Hussain was one of the most Influential politicians in the United Punjab 
Ubaidullah Sindhi pre-partition Muslim Scholar and leader
Gulzarilal Nanda, Indian politician and twice Prime Minister of India
Umera Ahmad famous Urdu fiction writer of modern era
Chaudhry Naseer Ahmad Malhi a leading member of the Muslim League
Abdul Hakim Sialkoti famous Muslim intellectual of 16th century
Chaudhry Sir Shahab-ud-Din Virk, lawyer and politician in pre-partition.

Military
Air Marshal Zafar Chaudhry was the first Chief of Air Staff
Air Marshal M Latif Tambra |Chief of Air Staff]]
General Khalid Shameem Wynne the 14th Chairman of the Joint Chiefs of Staff Committee

Journalists and poets
Kuldip Nayar, Indian journalist
Amjad Islam Amjad, Urdu writer, lyricist, and poet
Rajinder Singh Bedi, writer
Khalid Hasan, who was born in Srinagar but studied and lived in Sialkot.
Hamid Mir, a Pakistani journalist who was born in Sialkot
Abdal Bela, Urdu writer

Politicians
Chaudhry Amir Hussain, former Speaker of Pakistan National Assembly, former acting President of Pakistan and Federal Minister of Pakistan 3 times
Khawaja Muhammad Safdar, Pakistani politician and former acting President of Pakistan
Syed Iftikhar Ul Hassan, Politician from Allo Mahar, re-elected several time as a Member of the National Assembly.
Khawaja Muhammad Asif, politician and Federal Minister of Pakistan
Firdous Ashiq Awan, former federal Minister
Mumtaz Kahloon, politician
Gulzari Lal Nanda, former acting Indian Prime Minister

Scientist
Pervaiz Iqbal Cheema

Artists
Waheed Murad, Pakistani film actor
Rajender Kumar, Indian film actor
A. K. Hangal, Indian film actor
Dev Anand, Indian film actor, born in Tehsil Shakargarh, now in Sialkot.
Ghulam Ali, ghazal singer

Sportsmen
Shoaib Malik, former captain of Pakistani cricket team
Ijaz Ahmed, cricketer, played for Pakistan national cricket team.
Zaheer Abbas, Pakistani cricketer
Abdul Rahman, Pakistani cricketer
Shahnaz Sheikh, Pakistan national hockey team player
Mansoor Amjad, Zahid Fazal, Pakistan national cricket team players.
Sikandar Raza, Zimbabwean cricket player
Jawaid Iqbal, Hong Kong national cricket player
Nasir Ali, Pakistan national hockey team player
Asif Bajwa, Pakistan national hockey team player
Tariq Sheikh, Pakistan national hockey team player
Muhammad Waqas, Pakistan national hockey team player
Mahmood Hussain, Pakistan national hockey team player
Maqsood Hussain, Pakistan national hockey team player
Munir Bhatti, Pakistan national hockey team player
Kamran Ashraf, Pakistan national hockey team player
Haris Sohail, Pakistani cricketer
Mukhtar Ahmed, Pakistani cricketer

Others
Chaudhry Abdul Jalil, also known as Chacha Cricket

Notes and references

Notes

References

 
Districts of Punjab, Pakistan